Michele Reynolds is an American business owner and member of the Ohio Senate.

In the 2022 midterm election, she made history as the first African-American woman elected as a Republican in Franklin County.

Experience 
In 2019, she was elected Township Trustee for Madison Township in Franklin County.

She was criticized in 2022 for referencing an antisemitic phrase in a 2014 book. Several leaders of The Ohio Jewish Communities commented that her remarks were taken out of context and acknowledged their support for her leadership.

Reynolds won election to the Ohio Senate in 2022 defeating incumbent Democrat Tina Maharath.

Electoral history

References

African-American state legislators in Ohio
Women state legislators in Ohio
Republican Party Ohio state senators
Living people
21st-century American politicians
21st-century American women politicians
Year of birth missing (living people)